The Seal of Bulacan is one of the official symbols of the province of Bulacan in the Philippines.

Description
On the chief of the shield of seal of Bulacan are the hills of Kakarong and Biak-na-Bato in the towns of Pandi and San Miguel respectively. These hills were the location where the Bulacan-based republics are proclaimed; the Kakarong Republic and the Republic of Biak-na-Bato. The chief is blue, the same as the shade of blue of the flag of the Philippines, which symbolizes the values of peace, truth and justice.

The Barasoain Church can be found on the fess of the shield. The church was the location of the First Philippine Congress which was convened in 1898 and the proclamation of the First Philippine Republic on the same year.

The three Sampaguita (Jasminum sambac) flowers on the lower portion of the shield represents the three republics claimed in Bulacan - Kakarong (1896), Biak-na-Bato (1897), and the Philippine Republic(1898). The lower portion of the shield is red, the same as the shade of red of the flag of the Philippines, which symbolizes patriotism and valor.

The shield is enclosed by bamboo, which represents the spears and lances of the Katipuneros used during the Philippine Revolution which were believed to be made from Kawayang Bocaue, also known as Kawayang Bansot, a type of bamboo. The bamboo also symbolizes the resiliency of the inhabitants of the province.

The words PROVINCE OF BULACAN and OFFICIAL SEAL is present in the seal. "1578" can also be optionally placed on top of the shield representing the foundation year of the province.

References

seal
Bulacan
Bulacan
Bulacan
Bulacan